Antonino (Tony) Foti (born May 12, 1962) is the current assistant coach and recruiting coordinator at Middle Tennessee State University, current head coach of the Greek National Team and owner of SportMind consulting.

Italian League record
2013 Valmarecchia ASD
2012 San Marino Hornets, Republic of San Marino
2011 ASD Macerata
2009-2010 Nuoro SC, Nuoro, IT, 
2007-2008 Forli SC, Forli, IT

Collegiate Coaching Record

2013-current Middle Tennessee State University Assistant Coach, Murfreesboro. TN
2018 C-USA Champions
2001-2007 - Mercer University, Macon, GA
2003 Atlantic Sun Coach of the Year
142 wins 148 losses, 3 ASUN Conf. Tournament appearances.
2003 season best record in school history, 35–23, winningest coach in Mercer U softball history.

1995-2001 - University California, Santa Barbara
2000 Big West Conf Coaching Staff of the year
1979-1996 - Softball Canada amateur club teams. 1994-1998 National Champions in several categories.
1989 Team Manitoba Canada Summer Games Coach
2005 Inducted into Sport Manitoba and Softball Manitoba Hall of Fames

National Team Coaching Record
Foti is the current head coach of the Greek Softball National Women’s Team. Appointed in October 2016, Foti coached Greece at the 2017 ESF Championship, 2018 ESF U23 Championship, 2018 ESF Super 6 Championship and the 2019 WBSC-Europe Women’s Championship. 

Foti acted as head coach or assistant coach within Softball Canada's national team program from 1987 to 1996 and again from 2005 to 2013. Coached at 6 World Championships, 3 Pan American Championships, 7 Canada Cup International Tournament, and other national team events. Led Canada's entry into 2009 U16 World Championships in Prague, CZ (5th) and 2011 U19 World Championships in Cape Town, South Africa. He was the National team coach in 17 international events including alternate coach for the 1996 Olympic Games.

Club Team Record
Foti coached several club teams beginning in 1979 in Winnipeg, Manitoba, Canada. He has over 1000 victories in career, with 4 National Championships.

Personal life
Tony Foti is married to Candida Cerri, former Italian Softball National Team player. Foti has two children from a previous marriage: a son Dayne, 28, and a daughter Devyn, 30

Earned BA in Management (International College, Los Angeles, 1985)
Earned BS in Health & Physical Ed (LaSalle U, 2000).

References

 http://www.softball.mb.ca/Documents/2010_Jr_Women_Team_Pool.pdf
 
 http://www.sirc.ca/news_view.cfm?id=21363&search=Africa&show=search&month=&year=&search_where=
 http://www.marcheguida.it/section/articolo.asp?ID=7955
 http://www.cronachemaceratesi.it/2011/03/25/softball-a1-riprende-il-campionato-per-il-foresi-mosca-macerata/59840/
 http://members.atlanticsun.org/news/default/45/1580/https://nfca.org/index.php/front-page-news/2147-transactions-july-august-2001-updated-83101
https://goblueraiders.com/sports/softball/roster/coaches/tony-foti/1747

Softball coaches
American sports coaches
1962 births
Living people
Mercer Bears softball coaches
UC Santa Barbara Gauchos softball coaches